This is a list of streams and rivers in Vietnam:

Northwestern

Black River (Asia)
Ma River
Nanxi River (Yunnan)
Bôi River

Northeastern

Gâm River
Lô River
Phó Đáy River
Nho Quế River
Bằng River
Quây Sơn River
Ba Thín River
Bắc Giang River
Bắc Khê River
Kỳ Cùng River
Lục Nam River
Thương River
Cầu River
Công River
Sỏi River
Thái Bình River
Beilun River
Thao River

Red River Delta

Red River
Luộc River
Cà Lồ River
Đuống River
Cấm River (Vietnam)
Kinh Môn River
Kinh Thầy River
Đáy River
Bạch Đằng River
Tô Lịch River

North Central Coast

Cả River
Nam Sam River
Gianh River
Kiến Giang River
Long Đại River
Nhật Lệ River
Ron (river, Vietnam)
Son River (Vietnam)
Sepon River
Thạch Hãn River
Bến Hải River
Perfume River
Kong River

South Central Coast

Cu Đê River
Hàn River
Túy Loan River
Yên River (Quảng Nam-Đà Nẵng)
Thu Bồn River
Trà Bồng River
Trà Khúc River
Côn River
Hà Thanh River
La Tinh River
Hinh River
Đà Rằng River
Cái River
Cà Ty River
La Ngà River
Phan River

Central Highlands

Krông Nô River
Krông H’Năng River
Krông Ana River
Srepok River
Tonlé San
Đa Nhim River

Southeastern

Vàm Cỏ Đông River
Bé River
Đồng Nai river
Thị Vải River
Ray River
Saigon River
Bến Nghé River
Soài Rạp
Vàm Cỏ
Dinh River (Bà Rịa–Vũng Tàu)

Mekong Delta

Tiền River
Mỹ Tho River
Gò Công River
Bến Tre River
Ba Lai River
Cổ Chiên River
Hàm Luông River
Bình Di River
Châu Đốc River
Bassac River, or Hậu River
Vàm Nao River
Bảo Định Canal
Thoại Hà Canal
Trẹm River
Cửa Lớn River
Bồ Đề River
Ông Đốc River

Phú Quốc island
Dương Đông river

Gallery

Notes
The list of rivers almost exactly from North to South.

See also
 List of waterways
 Mekong River Commission
 Vietnam Inland Waterways Administration
 Rivers in Vietnam

 
Vietnam
Rivers